Henry Cawdron Stenton (15 September 1815 – 6 March 1887) was an English first-class cricketer and solicitor.

The head of a family firm of solicitors at Southwell, Stenton made a single appearance in first-class cricket for the Gentlemen of Southwell against England at Southwell in 1846. He batted once in the match, ending the Gentlemen of Southwell's first-innings not out on 5.

He died at Southwell in March 1887. His son was Sir Frank Stenton, a noted historian.

References

External links

1815 births
1887 deaths
People from Southwell, Nottinghamshire
Cricketers from Nottinghamshire
English cricketers
Gentlemen of Southwell cricketers
English solicitors
19th-century English lawyers